Goa Gil, born Gilbert Levey, is an American-born musician, DJ, remixer and party organizer. He is one of the founders of the goa trance and psytrance movement in electronic music.

Biography
Gil was born in 1951 and grew up in San Rafael, California. He witnessed the birth of the hippie movement and acid rock, and was involved with the freak collectives Family Dog and Sons of Champlin. Feeling that the San Francisco musical scene was falling apart, he took off in 1969, going first to Amsterdam and then to India, settling in Goa. Here he discovered the sadhus, wandering holy men living off the forest, covering themselves with ash, and drinking the "elixir of the gods." Soon, Gil himself became a Sadhu, Baba Mangalanand, in the order of the Juna Akhara, under the Guru, Mahant Nirmalanand Saraswati.

During the early 1980s, many Goa hippies were becoming increasingly fascinated with early electronic music such as Kraftwerk. Gil and his friends soon gathered some equipment and started DJing and playing live music all night long on the Goa beaches. The mix of outdoor electronic dance parties with Eastern mystical and spiritual overtones came to define the aesthetic of the psytrance movement. For Gil, dance is an active form of meditation and the use of trance music is a way to "redefine the ancient tribal ritual for the 21st century". During the 1990s, the aesthetic of the Goa trance movement spread by way of European and Israeli backpackers who attended parties in India. 
He was interviewed for the 2001 documentary Last Hippie Standing which explored the scene in Goa.
In January 2006 Goa Gil DJ'ed the all-night closing party of the three-day LSD-symposium at Basel, Switzerland, in honor of LSD-inventor Albert Hofmann's 100-years birthday January 11, 2006, after Hofmann himself had delivered the closing speech of the symposium.
Gil is married to Ariane. Together they formed the band "the Nommos".

References

External links 
 

Living people
American electronic musicians
Musicians from California
1951 births
Hippies